Erikka Lynn Storch is a Republican member of the West Virginia House of Delegates.  She has represented District 3 since 2011. In 2010, she announced her intentions to seek one of the two seats being vacated by outgoing Representative Orphy Klempa and Tal Hutchins. She faced off against future Representative Ryan Ferns, businessman Dolph Santorine, and attorney Shawn Fluharty in the general election. She placed first with nearly 5,000 votes.

References

1971 births
Living people
Republican Party members of the West Virginia House of Delegates
Wheeling University alumni
Women state legislators in West Virginia
21st-century American politicians
21st-century American women politicians